is a Japanese footballer currently playing as a right back for Cerezo Osaka.

Career statistics

Club
Updated to 18 July 2022.

Notes

References

External links

1997 births
Living people
Japanese footballers
Association football forwards
J1 League players
J2 League players
V-Varen Nagasaki players
Cerezo Osaka players